Archibald John Harris (22 December 1892 – 10 April 1955) was an English cricketer. Harris was a right-handed batsman. He was born at Rugby, Warwickshire.

Harris made a single first-class appearance for Warwickshire against Worcestershire in 1919 at New Road, Worcester. Worcestershire won the toss and elected to bat first, making 187 all out. In response, Warwickshire were dismissed in their first-innings for 145, with Harris dismissed for 4 runs by William Taylor. Worcestershire then made 102/7 declared in their second-innings, leaving Warwickshire with a target of 145 for victory. Harris opened the innings in Warwickshire's chase alongside Frederick Santall, scoring 14 runs before he was dismissed by Robert Burrows. Warwickshire reached their target for the loss of two wickets. This was his only major appearance for the county.

Harris died at Lymington, Hampshire, on 10 April 1955. His brother, William, also played first-class cricket.

References

External links
Archibald Harris at ESPNcricinfo
Archibald Harris at CricketArchive

1892 births
1955 deaths
Sportspeople from Rugby, Warwickshire
English cricketers
Warwickshire cricketers